"Little Boy Lost" is the first segment of the fourth episode of the first season (1985–86) of the television series The Twilight Zone. Despite the similar title, it has no connection to the 1960s The Twilight Zone episode "Little Girl Lost". The story follows a woman who, while trying to decide between pursuing a globetrotting career and having a family, forms a relationship with a mysterious young boy.

Plot
Carol Shelton, a photographer, is offered a prestigious international assignment. Her long-time boyfriend, Greg, is upset because he wants to have children and she believes that having a globetrotting career would prevent her from getting any fulfillment out of motherhood. At his urging, she agrees to reflect on it further. The next day she goes to the zoo for an assigned shoot and meets a boy who challenges her to guess his name; she comes up with Kenneth, aka Kenny. She presumes he is the model from the agency, which he affirms. They have a lot of fun during the photo shoot, but when she begins asking personal questions he leaves in alarm. While developing the photos, Carol gets a call from the agency apologizing for failing to send a model.

Carol decides to take the job, and she and Greg break up. Kenny appears to her in her apartment. He expresses disappointment in her decision to take the job, and apologizes for lying about being from the agency. When she asks how he knew where she lives, Kenny again panics and runs away.

Carol sees Kenny in a park and confronts him. He won't explicitly tell her who he is because "It's against the rules", but she has already figured out that Kenny is the son she would have had if she chose to stay with Greg instead of taking the job. She says that she does want him, and makes a promise that she will have children someday, but Kenny replies that even if she does eventually have a son, it will not be him. They commiserate as the boy fades away.

Carol discusses her new job over the phone. Photos of Kenny and Carol together are arranged in the apartment. After she ends the call and leaves, Kenny vanishes from the photographs.

External links
 

1985 American television episodes
The Twilight Zone (1985 TV series season 1) episodes